USS Contoocook was a screw sloop-of-war built for the United States Navy during the American Civil War. She is named after a river and village in New Hampshire. She was launched  at Portsmouth Navy Yard and commissioned , commanded by Captain George Balch.

Her first cruise, as flagship of the North Atlantic Squadron, took her to the West Indies, where she patrolled extensively for the protection of American interests during 1868 and 1869. She served as a quarantine ship at New York until sold .

Cootoocook-class sloop 
 USS Contoocook (1864)
 
 
 

Cancelled ships include:

References 

Sloops of the United States Navy
1864 ships